Émile Moreau (20 June 1877 – 28 January 1959) was a Francophone Canadian politician of the Quebec Liberal Party.  He was elected member of the Legislative Assembly of Quebec for Lac-Saint-Jean (1919–1931) and then Roberval (1931–1935), at the 15th, 16th and 18th Assemblies.  He was also Legislative Councillor for Lauzon (6 June 1935 – 1959).

References

1877 births
1959 deaths
Quebec Liberal Party MNAs
Quebec Liberal Party MLCs